Frieda is a 1946 play by the British writer Ronald Millar.

It was first performed at the Theatre Royal, Brighton before transferring to the Westminster Theatre where it ran for 132 performances from 2 May to 24 August 1946.

The following year it was adapted by Ealing Studios into a film of the same name directed by Basil Dearden and starring Mai Zetterling and David Farrar.

References

Bibliography
 Goble, Alan. The Complete Index to Literary Sources in Film. Walter de Gruyter, 1999.
 Wearing, J.P. The London Stage 1940-1949: A Calendar of Productions, Performers, and Personnel.  Rowman & Littlefield, 2014.

1946 plays
Plays by Ronald Millar
West End plays